Rediscovered may refer to:

 Rediscovered (A1 album), 2012
 Rediscovered (Andreas Johnson album), 2008
 Rediscovered (Mississippi John Hurt album), 1998
 Re:(disc)overed, an album by Puddle of Mudd, 2011

See also 
 List of rediscovered films